The 2023 Vanderbilt Commodores football team will represent Vanderbilt University in the Eastern Division of the Southeastern Conference (SEC) during the 2023 NCAA Division I FBS football season. The Commodores are expected to be led by Clark Lea in his third year as their head coach. 

The Vanderbilt football team plays its home games at FirstBank Stadium in Nashville, Tennessee.

Schedule
Vanderbilt and the SEC announced the 2023 football schedule on September 20, 2022. The 2023 Commodores' schedule consists of 6 home games and 6 away games for the regular season. Vanderbilt will host four SEC conference opponents Auburn, Georgia (rivalry), Kentucky (rivalry) and Missouri at home and will travel to four SEC opponents, Florida, Ole Miss (rivalry), South Carolina and Tennessee (rivalry) to close out the SEC regular season on the road. Vanderbilt is not scheduled to play SEC West opponents Alabama, Arkansas, LSU, Mississippi State and Texas A&M in the 2023 regular season. The Commodores' have two bye weeks this season.

Vanderbilt's out of conference opponents represent the ACC, Mountain West and SWAC. The Commodores will host two of the four non–conference games which are against Alabama A&M from the SWAC and Hawaii from the Mountain West. The Commodores will travel to two non–conference games which are against UNLV also from the Mountain West and will travel to Wake Forest from the ACC.

References

Vanderbilt
Vanderbilt Commodores football seasons
Vanderbilt Commodores football